The Paddys Island, part of the Waterhouse Island Group, is a  uninhabited granite island situated in the Tasman Sea, lying close to the north-eastern coast of Tasmania, Australia.

Other islands in the Waterhouse Group include Ninth, Tenth, Waterhouse, Little Waterhouse, Maclean, Baynes, Foster, Swan, Little Swan, Cygnet and St Helens islands and Bird Rock and George Rocks islets.

Fauna
The island forms part of the St Helens Important Bird Area, identified as such by BirdLife International because of its importance as a breeding site for seabirds and waders.

Recorded breeding seabird and wader species are little penguin, Pacific gull, silver gull, kelp gull, sooty oystercatcher and Caspian tern.

See also

List of islands of Tasmania

References

Islands of North East Tasmania
Important Bird Areas of Tasmania
Waterhouse Island group